Abdullo Tangriev (born 28 March 1981) is an Uzbek judoka. He won a silver medal in the +100 kg category of the 2008 Olympic Games.

Early life 
Abdullo Tangriev was born on 28 March 1981, in Surxondaryo Region. He was engaged with judo from the age 10. From 1995 he started training in Chirchiq Olympics school. He was able to show his talent from early ages, and in the age of 19 he was called to the Uzbekistan National Olympics team, and attended in 2000 Summer Olympics

Career 
After the Olympics, he won the Uzbekistan championship from judo, in 2001. In 2003 for the first time in his career he became the champion of Asia, in super weight category which was held in Jeju Province. In coming for years (2005, 2007, 2008, 2011) he also became the champion of Asia in judo.

In the same year of 2003 Tangriev won the third place in 23rd World Judo Championship which took place in Osaka. In the years of 2005 (Rio de Janeiro) and 2009 (Rotterdam) he twice was honored as the bronze medal owner in Judo World Championship.

In 2008 Summer Olympics Tangriev was able to reach the final stage of tournament in category of 100kg's, where he lost the fight, and got the second place.

In 2012 Summer Olympics Tangriev was disqualified from professional sport, due to cannabis being detected in his drug test.

References

External links
 
 

1981 births
Living people
Uzbeks
Uzbekistani male judoka
Judoka at the 2000 Summer Olympics
Judoka at the 2004 Summer Olympics
Judoka at the 2008 Summer Olympics
Judoka at the 2016 Summer Olympics
Olympic judoka of Uzbekistan
Olympic silver medalists for Uzbekistan
Place of birth missing (living people)
Olympic medalists in judo
Asian Games medalists in judo
Medalists at the 2008 Summer Olympics
Judoka at the 2002 Asian Games
Judoka at the 2006 Asian Games
Judoka at the 2010 Asian Games
Judoka at the 2014 Asian Games
Jacket Wrestlers
Asian Games silver medalists for Uzbekistan
Asian Games bronze medalists for Uzbekistan
Medalists at the 2002 Asian Games
Medalists at the 2006 Asian Games
Medalists at the 2010 Asian Games
Medalists at the 2014 Asian Games
Universiade medalists in judo
Universiade gold medalists for Uzbekistan
Medalists at the 2003 Summer Universiade